Fox Factory Holding Corp. is an American company best known for their Fox Racing Shox brand of off-road racing suspension components.

History 
In 1974, Bob Fox ran a small business distributing suspension components for motocross bikes with his brother Geoff. In 1977, the company split into what became Fox Racing (later Fox Head Inc.) under Geoff Fox, and Bob Fox's Fox Racing Shox parts production company, Fox Factory. A holding company, Fox Factory Holding, was established in 1978. Fox Factory produces suspension components for motorcycles, automobiles, all-terrain vehicles, side-by-sides, trophy trucks, snowmobiles, and mountain bikes.

In 2008 it was bought by a private equity firm, Compass Diversified Holdings. It went public in 2013.

Acquisitions 
From 2014 through 2021, Fox Factory acquired several groups spanning mountain bike, truck suspension, turn-key truck upfitting, performance car suspension, and custom designed adventure van categories.

Timeline

2014 
Sport Truck USA, Coldwater, MI 

Fox Acquired several brands under the "Sport Truck USA" umbrella, including;

 BDS Suspension: Premium suspension kits
 Zone Offroad: Entry-level suspension kits
 JKS Manufacturing: Jeep specific suspension kits

Race Face, Vancouver, B.C.

Manufactures and distributes high performance cycling components, apparel, and protection.

Easton

Manufactures and distributes bike components and apparel.

2015 
Marzocchi (Bicycles)

Fox acquired certain assets of Marzocchi dedicated to mountain bike suspension.

2017 
Tuscany Motors, Elkhart, IN

Vehicle upfitter focused on full-size trucks on Ford, Ram, and Chevrolet platforms.

2019 
RideTech, Jasper, IN

Manufacturer of traditional, coilover, and air suspension systems for muscle cars, trucks, and hot rods.

2020 
SCA Performance, Trussville, AL

Vehicle upfitter focused on full-size trucks on the Chevrolet, Ford, and RAM platforms. Brands brought to market under the SCA Performance umbrella include Black Widow, Rocky Ridge Trucks, and Rocky Mountain Truckworks.

2021 
Outside Van, Portland OR

Custom converter of adventure vans on the Mercedes Sprinter platform.

Products

Mountain bike suspensions

In 2016, sales of mountain bike related equipment (primarily suspension products) accounted for 56% of the company's total revenue.

Forks
As of 2016, all available in 26", 27.5", & 29" wheel sizes (except where noted) and tapered steerer tubes, with straight 1-1/8" tubes on select models. Talas springs are externally adjustable down by 20-30mm.

(stanchion size in mm, air spring type, travel range in mm)

Cross country
 32 Float 100-150
 32 Talas 120-150 (discontinued)
(1-1/8" steerer available)

Trail
 34 Float 120-150
 34 Talas 140-150 (discontinued)
(27.5"+ replaces 26" wheel option)

All mountain
 36 factory (grip2 and fit 4 dampers) 150–160 mm of travel
 36 performance elite (grip, grip 2, and fit 4 dampers) 150–160 mm of travel
 36e factory (ebike ready) (grip2 damper) 140 and 160 mm of travel
 36e performance elite (ebike ready) (grip and grip2 dampers) 160 mm of travel
 36 Talas 150-180 (discontinued)

(1-1/8" steerer available)

Dirt jump
 32 831 100 (discontinued)
(26" wheel only, 1-1/8" steerer available)

Downhill
 40 Float 203, for wheels: 27.5” & 29” (called the "40", for a short period the 29” variant was called a “49” but was latter reverted to “40” to avoid confusion).
( 1-1/8" steerer available)
 40 Van (coil spring)(discontinued)

Shocks

Air spring
 Float [DPS]
 Float X2
 Float DPX2
 Float x

Coil spring
 DHX2
 DHX

Off-Road Division 
In 2014 Fox introduced the Performance Series line of Off-Road shocks and rebranded their existing shocks as Factory Series.  The differences between the two lines of shocks are extensive, nearly every part has been redesigned.

Air Bump Product Lines:
 2.0 Factory Series Pinch Mount Air Bump
 2.5 Factory Series Stud Mount Air Bump
 2.5 Factory Series Pinch Mount Air Bump
Air Shock Product Lines:
 2.0 Factory Series Air Shock
 2.5 Factory Series Air Shock
Bypass Product Lines:
 2.0 Factory Series Bypass
 2.5 Factory Series Bypass
 3.0 Factory Series Bypass
 3.5 Factory Series Bypass
 4.0 Factory Series Bypass
 4.4 Factory Series Bypass
Coilover Product Lines:
 2.0 Factory Series Coilover
 2.5 Factory Series Coilover
 2.5 Performance Series Coilover
 3.0 Factory Series Coilover
Smoothie Product Lines:
 2.0 Factory Series Smoothie
 2.5 Factory Series Smoothie
 2.5 Performance Series Smoothie
 3.0 Factory Series Smoothie

See also 

 Motorcycle suspension
 List of motorcycle suspension manufacturers

References

External links 
 Fox Racing Official Site

Motorcycle racing
Cycle suspension manufacturers
Automotive companies established in 1977
Watsonville, California
1977 establishments in California
Cycle manufacturers of the United States
Motorcycle parts manufacturers